Jan Bakulo, Jan Bakuło (born 1 April 1991 in Vilnius, Lithuania) is Lithuanian professional water polo player of Lithuanian nationality.

Clubs 
In 2008 Bakulo won German Junior cup and U-17 for Hellas- Hildesheim Club.
In 2009 Bakulo won Lithuanian Junior Cup with Vilnius Sports School team.

In 2011-2012 Bakulo played for German club White Sharks Hannover. During 2014-2015 season he played for Polish club Legia Warszawa.

He moved to Poland after he graduated from High School. He became the top scorer of the Polish league and received a Polish Identity Card. He debuted with Polish National Team.

Since 2015 Bakulo is playing for German club ASC Duisburg and 2016 win 2 place in German Bundesliga. 2017 Place 3 in German Bundesliga 
Played Champions League 2016 ,2018 ,2020 with ASC Duisburg
Played Euro Cup 2021 with ASC Duisburg

National team 
Jan Bakulo started competing on international level with Lithuanian National Junior and senior Team.

As of 2014 Bakulo is a captain of Lithuania men's national water polo team.

Personal life 
In 2014 Jan started dating Lithuanian professional dancer and social media influencer Monika Šalčiūnaitė.

References

1991 births
Living people
Sportspeople from Vilnius
Lithuanian male water polo players
Lithuanian people of Polish descent